Computer Foreign Exchange is a 1982 video game published by Avalon Hill.

Gameplay
Computer Foreign Exchange is a game in which the player acts on behalf of an American company with international assets trying to accumulate money the fastest.

Reception
Bob Proctor reviewed the game for Computer Gaming World, and stated that "this is a decent game and a good program provided you have someone to play with. The price is right and it only takes 16K!"

References

1982 video games
Avalon Hill video games
Business simulation games
TRS-80 games
TRS-80-only games
Video games developed in the United States